CyrusOne owns and operates over 40 carrier-neutral data centers in North America, Europe, and South America, where it provides colocation and peering services. It is headquartered in Dallas, Texas and is owned by funds managed by Kohlberg Kravis Roberts and Global Infrastructure Partners.

History
The company was formed in July 2000 by David Ferdman and Larry Bursten, who met when companies they founded were acquired by IXC Communications.

In July 2007, the company was acquired by ABRY Partners.

In June 2010, the company was acquired by Cincinnati Bell for $525 million.

In September 2011, the company acquired 55.9 acres in Chandler, Arizona for construction of a data center facility.

In January 2013, the company became a public company via an initial public offering.

By 2015, Cincinnati Bell had sold almost its entire stake in the company.

In July 2015, the company acquired Cervalis for approximately $400 million.

In March 2016, the company acquired a data center of CME Group in Aurora, Illinois for $130 million in a leaseback transaction. In December 2016, the company broke ground on a 425,000 square foot data center on the property.

In June 2016, the company purchased a 40-acre parcel in Loudoun County, Virginia.

In August 2017, the company acquired Zenium Data Centers, a provider with data centers in London and Frankfurt, for $442 million.

In December 2019, the company suffered from a REvil ransomware attack that affected 6 of its customers.

In February 2020, Tesh Durvasula was appointed president and chief executive officer of the company.

In July 2021, David Ferdman, the co-founder and former CEO, was appointed interim president and chief executive officer of the company.

In March 2022, the company sold its assets in Houston for $670 million.

Also in March 2022, the company was acquired by Kohlberg Kravis Roberts and Global Infrastructure Partners for $15 billion.

References

External links

Real estate companies of the United States
2001 establishments in Maryland
2007 mergers and acquisitions
2010 mergers and acquisitions
2013 initial public offerings
2022 mergers and acquisitions
American companies established in 2001
Real estate companies established in 2001
Cincinnati Bell
Companies based in Dallas
Companies formerly listed on the Nasdaq
Corporate spin-offs
Data centers
Kohlberg Kravis Roberts companies